Elachista diederichsiella is a moth of the family Elachistidae. It is found from Fennoscandia and northern Russia to the Pyrenees, Alps and Carpathian Mountains, and from France to central Russia. It is also found in North America.

Adults are on wing from June to August.

The larvae feed on Holcus mollis and Milium effusum. They mine the leaves of their host plant. The mine descends from just below the leaf tip. It starts as a narrow corridor, that widens abruptly into a broad, whitish, strongly inflated blotch. Two to four larvae may be found in single a mine. The frass is distributed irregularly in the entire mine. Pupation takes place outside of the mine. Larvae can be found from April to May. They are dirty yellowish green with a dark brown head.

References

External links
Lepiforum.de

diederichsiella
Moths described in 1889
Moths of Europe
Moths of North America